Rock Da Party is the studio album by Sukshinder Shinda released on 12 July 2012.

Videos were released for "Nanka Mail" , "Hurrr" , "Ni Sohniye Ni" , "Mucch Khari",  and "One in a Million".

Track listing
All music composed by Sukshinder Shinda

References

External links 
https://itunes.apple.com/us/album/rock-da-party/id544006319

2012 albums